Carolyn Parkhurst (born January 18, 1971, Manchester, New Hampshire) is an American author who has published five books. Her first, the 2003 best-seller The Dogs of Babel also known as Lorelei's Secret in the UK, was a New York Times Notable Book and on  The New York Times Best Seller List.

She followed that effort with The New York Times bestselling Lost and Found in June 2006 and The Nobodies Album in June 2010.  Her first children's book, written with Dan Yaccarino, Cooking with Henry and Elliebelly, was released in Fall, 2010.

Parkhurst says she wrote her first story at age three by dictating The Table Family to her mother.  An only child, she grew up in Waltham, Massachusetts; her parents separated when she was two years old. Parkhurst spent so much time reading as a child, she had to be sent outside to play. She attended Belmont Day School and the Winsor School in Boston. Her first story in print was for a Halloween contest by a local newspaper.

Her first job in publishing came at age 15, writing record reviews for Star Hits magazine. Parkhurst received her B.A. degree from Wesleyan University and an M.F.A. in creative writing from American University. Married since 1998 and the mother of two children, she currently resides in Washington, D.C.

References

External links

Author's website

American women writers
American University alumni
Wesleyan University alumni
Living people
1971 births
Writers from Manchester, New Hampshire
People from Waltham, Massachusetts
Writers from Massachusetts
21st-century American women